A favela is a Brazilian slum neighborhood.

Favela may also refer to:
Cnidoscolus quercifolius, a tree native to Brazil
Armando Favela (b. 1986), Mexican golfer
Cristian Favela (b. 1979), Mexican boxer
Marlene Favela (b. 1977), Mexican actress
"Favela", an instrumental composition by Antonio Carlos Jobim from The Wonderful World of Antonio Carlos Jobim
"Favela", a 2018 song by Ina Wroldsen and Alok

See also
Favila, 8th-century ruler of Asturias